Adagur  is a village in the southern state of Karnataka, India. It is located in the south side of Channarayapatna taluk of Hassan district in Karnataka.

See also
 Hassan
 Districts of Karnataka

References

External links
 http://Hassan.nic.in/
 "Lakshmi Narayana Temple, Adagur", a short video on Vimeo

Villages in Hassan district